Valtopina is a comune (municipality) in the Province of Perugia in the Italian region Umbria, located about 30 km east of Perugia. As of 31 December 2004, it had a population of 1,399 and an area of 40.5 km2.

The municipality of Valtopina contains the frazioni (subdivisions, mainly villages and hamlets) Giove, Sasso, Poggio, Ponte Rio, Balciano, Santa Cristina, Gallano, and Casatommaso.

Valtopina borders the following municipalities: Assisi, Foligno, Nocera Umbra, Spello.

Demographic evolution

References

External links
 www.comune.valtopina.pg.it/

Cities and towns in Umbria